The 2020–21 season was Cheltenham Town's 134th season in their history and the fifth consecutive season in EFL League Two, Along with League Two, the club also participated in the FA Cup, the EFL Trophy, and the EFL Cup.

The season covers the period from 1 July 2020 to 30 June 2021.

Transfers

Transfers in

Loans in

Loans out

Transfers out

Pre-season
Cheltenham Town announced pre-season friendlies against Bristol City, Evesham United and Stratford Town.

Competitions

EFL League Two

League table

Results summary

Results by matchday

Matches

The 2020–21 season fixtures were released on 21 August.

FA Cup

The draw for the first round was made on Monday 26, October. The second round draw was revealed on Monday, 9 November by Danny Cowley. The third round draw was made on 30 November, with Premier League and EFL Championship clubs all entering the competition. The draw for the fourth and fifth round were made on 11 January, conducted by Peter Crouch.

EFL Cup

The first round draw was made on 18 August, live on Sky Sports, by Paul Merson. The draw for both the second and third round were confirmed on September 6, live on Sky Sports by Phil Babb.

EFL Trophy

The regional group stage draw was confirmed on 18 August. The second round draw was made by Matt Murray on 20 November, at St Andrew’s.

References

Cheltenham Town
Cheltenham Town F.C. seasons